Khairun Sundari (English: A Beautiful Lady, Khairun) is a mid-2000s Bangladeshi folk film based on a true story starring Moushumi and Ferdous Ahmed in lead roles, directed by A K Sohel.It was remade in India as Praner Swami starring Ferdous Ahmed, Rachana Banerjee & A.T.M. Shamsuzzaman    It became the second highest-grossing Bangladeshi film.

Music
 "Khairun Lo Tor Lomba Mathar Kesh" - Momtaz Begum (it gained popularity across the country)

Notes

References

2000s Bengali-language films
Bengali-language Bangladeshi films